Rohloff is a surname. Notable people with the surname include:

Bernhard Rohloff, German businessman
Jon Rohloff (born 1969), American ice hockey player
Ken Rohloff (born 1939), American basketball player
Semon Rohloff (born 1970), Australian swimmer
Steingrimur Rohloff (born 1971), German composer
Todd Rohloff (born 1974), American ice hockey player

See also
Roloff
Rolon (disambiguation)